Dusi may refer to:

Dusi, Henan (都司镇), town in Dengzhou, Henan, China
Dusi, Shandong (都司镇), town in Mudan District, Heze, Shandong, China
Dusi, Andhra Pradesh, a village in Srikakulam district in the Indian state of Andhra Pradesh
Dusi, Tamil Nadu, a village in Tiruvanamalai district in the Indian state of Tamil Nadu
 The Dusi Canoe Marathon, a canoe race held annually on the Msunduzi and Mgeni Rivers in South Africa

See also
 Dusii, plural of Dusios, a divine being